Tommy Hall (born September 21, 1943) is an electric jug player from Texas. He was a founding member of the American psychedelic rock band The 13th Floor Elevators.

Early life
Hall was born in Memphis, Tennessee to Dr. Thomas James Hall and Margaret "Perky" Perkins, a nurse. Starting in 1961, he studied philosophy and psychology at the University of Texas at Austin, and also discovered psychedelic drugs such as LSD, which would form a major part of his philosophy. In Austin, he also met his future wife and occasional Elevators songwriter Clementine Hall (nee Tausch), who he married in 1964. They divorced in 1973.

Musical career
A special aspect of The Elevators' sound came from Tommy Hall's innovative electric jug. The jug, a crock-jug with a microphone held up to it while it was being blown, sounded somewhat like a cross between a Minimoog and cuica drum. In contrast to traditional musical jug technique, Hall did not blow into the jug to produce a tuba-like sound. Instead, he vocalized musical runs into the mouth of the jug, using the jug to create echo and distortion of his voice. When playing live, he held the microphone up to the mouth of the jug, but when recording the Easter Everywhere album, the recording engineer placed a microphone inside the jug to enhance the sound.

Personal life
Hall currently lives in downtown San Francisco. In the 1980s, he was rumored to be the true identity of Texas outsider musician Jandek, but this has since been disproven. He became a devout follower of Scientology in the 1970s. He is a lifelong Republican. He has told interviewers that he is no longer interested in music or thinks of himself as a musician, and that "I lost my jug a long time ago."

References 

1943 births
Musicians from Texas
Living people